The Lehman Trilogy is a three-act play by Italian novelist and playwright Stefano Massini. It follows the lives of three immigrant brothers from when they arrive in America and found an investment firm through to the collapse of the company in 2008. It has been translated into 24 languages, staged by such directors as Luca Ronconi and Sam Mendes, and was later published as a novel. The play was produced in the West End in 2018 by the National Theatre, was directed by Sam Mendes and included the cast of Simon Russell Beale, Adam Godley and Ben Miles. The production earned five Laurence Olivier Award nominations. 

The production made its Broadway transfer in March of 2020 and performed briefly before the Covid-19 pandemic. The play resumed performances in the fall of 2021 with Adrian Lester replacing Ben Miles. The production received universal critical acclaim and eight Tony Award nominations winning five awards including for Best Play, Best Direction of a Play for Sam Mendes and Best Actor in a Play for Simon Russell Beale.

Productions
The Lehman Trilogy opened at Comédie de Saint-Étienne in Saint-Étienne in a French translation. In 2015 Luca Ronconi directed the Italian premiere, at Piccolo Teatro in Milan. The play was eventually translated and staged in several cities across Europe.

Adapted by British playwright Ben Power and directed by British director Sam Mendes, the play made its English debut in London at the National Theatre in the Lyttelton Theatre, running from 12 July 2018 to 20 October 2018.

The National Theatre staging of the play transferred to the United States at the Park Avenue Armory, New York City, from 22 March 2019 to 20 April 2019.

This production then returned to the West End Piccadilly Theatre starting on 11 May 2019 for a limited twelve week run, which was extended for another 4 weeks, ending on 31 August 2019.

The National Theatre production was set to revisit the United States, originally to open on Broadway at the Nederlander Theatre on 7 March 2020 in previews, officially on 26 March. Adam Godley, Ben Miles, and Simon Russell Beale, who play the three title brothers, their sons, and grandsons, would reprise their performances. As of 12 March 2020, the show suspended production due to the COVID-19 pandemic. In June 2021, it was reported that The Lehman Trilogy would reopen in previews on 25 September 2021 and officially on 14 October. Godley and Beale would return to the production, while Adrian Lester would replace Miles. The Broadway production's final performance was on 2 January 2022.

The National Theatre production appeared at the Ahmanson Theatre in Los Angeles in a limited engagement from 3 March 2022 through 10 April 2022, starring Godley, Beale, and Howard W. Overshown, Miles' understudy from the Broadway production. The production was scheduled to continue in San Francisco at the American Conservatory Theater, but was indefinitely postponed on 3 March 2022 with the National Theatre Productions Managing Director citing "a myriad of obstacles that left us unable to say with confidence when the show can arrive in the Bay Area".

The production will return to London's West End at the Gillian Lynne Theatre for a limited season from 14 January to 20 May 2023, starring Nigel Lindsay, Michael Balogun and Hadley Fraser.

Overview
Mendes said: "The Lehman Trilogy was developed over three years without the constraint of a schedule, or even a plan — it was allowed time to find its form, and to build a wonderful team with which to make it. One of the chief joys has been to work across borders with two great writers, and to invite three of the finest actors of their generation to work with us. We are indebted to the National Theatre and the Park Avenue Armory for their unstinting support throughout..."

The original play lasts for five hours and Power has written it into a three-hour English version. With a cast of only three actors, Simon Russell Beale, Ben Miles, and Adam Godley, the play explores the vicissitude of American capitalism through the 164-year-history of Lehman Brothers, from when Henry Lehman, a German Jew, first migrated to the U.S. and opened his store in Alabama, to the bankruptcy of Lehman Brothers Holdings Inc. that exacerbated the 2008 financial crisis.

Cast

The three actors not only play the three Lehman brothers who founded the business but all other roles. They play their children and grandchildren, including Philip Lehman (son of Emanuel, played by Simon Russell Beale), Herbert Lehman (son of Mayer, played by Ben Miles), and Robert Lehman (son of Philip, played by Adam Godley), as well as various minor characters during the unfolding of family history such as wives, toddlers, and business partners, although they never change the original costume – tailored three-piece suits often seen in 19th-century portraits of men. The understudies for the roles of Henry, Emanuel, and Mayer Lehman at the National Theatre were Leighton Pugh, Dominik Tiefenthaler, and Will Harrison-Wallace, respectively. Tiefenthaler replaced Miles during the show's run at the Piccadilly Theatre.

Reviews
The play has been highly praised by critics for "the successful adaptation that both preserves the essence, the poetic language of the original play and makes it more succinct"; "the elegant, well-paced direction that narrates with simplicity, depth and richness"; and "the superb, versatile acting of the cast, who seem to metamorphose at will with the characters they put on". The set design by Es Devlin – a rotating glass box furnished in the style of a contemporary office, as well as the video projection in the back stage that accompany the set, showing the changing landscapes in time and space during the development of the business and American capitalism created by Luke Halls, also made a great impression. Both The Guardian and The Times give the play a five-star mark. The New York Times called the Broadway production "captivating" and "a vividly human tale, nimbly performed by three of the finest actors around".

The play has been critiqued for not mentioning the Lehman family's involvement with slavery. Sarah Churchwell, writing for The New York Review of Books, criticized the play for "profoundly underplaying not only the firm’s deep entanglement in the slave economy, but also that of the brothers themselves, who held slaves for at least twenty years." The Washington Post'''s Richard Cohen wrote that the play was "silent" on the issue of slavery and that the playwright should have addressed the topic because "To not mention slavery is in itself a statement — of disinterest, of unimportance, of lesser importance, of something. Would an American playwright, confronted on a daily basis with the economic, cultural and historical ramifications of slavery, have made the same decision? I can’t imagine it."

AntisemitismThe Lehman Trilogy, written by a non-Jew, has been accused of being "profoundly antisemitic" and perpetuating negative, historical stereotypes about Jews and money. Dave Rich, writing in The Observer, said:

Awards and nominations
 Original London production 

Original Broadway production

Novel
The story was further developed into a novel published in Italian in 2016 under the title Qualcosa sui Lehman, and appeared in English in 2020 as The Lehman Trilogy'', translated by Richard Dixon.

References

Italian plays
2013 plays
Lehman Brothers
Tony Award-winning plays
Works set in the 2000s
Fiction set in 2008